Gonçalo Cardoso may refer to:

 Gonçalo Cardoso (footballer, born 1990), Portuguese footballer
 Gonçalo Cardoso (footballer, born 2000), Portuguese footballer